Fernando León may refer to:
 Fernando León Boissier, Spanish sailor
 Fernando León de Aranoa, Spanish screenwriter and film director
 Fernando León, 1st Marquis of the Muni, Spanish politician and diplomat
 Fernando León (footballer) (born 1993), Ecuadorian footballer